Carter Caves State Resort Park is located in Carter County, Kentucky, United States, along Tygarts Creek. It is formed by Carter Caves, and nearby Cascade Caves, which were added to the park in 1959. On December 16, 1981,  of the park were designated as nature preserves. Bat Cave and Cascade Caverns State Nature Preserves were dedicated for the protection of the Indiana bat, mountain maple, and Canada yew, all endangered species.

History
The park was in various private hands for almost 200 years until the last private family owners, the J.F. Lewis family and various other private investors, including local Rotary Clubs, donated the large tract of property to the Commonwealth of Kentucky in 1946. The purchase of the caves and surrounding land was driven by Governor William Jason Fields, a native of Carter County.

Attractions

Resort park

Caves

There are several cave tours offered. Guided tours of Cascade Cave and X-Cave are available year round. Bat Cave and Saltpetre Cave are only open in the summer, and close during the winter hibernation season due to the threat of white nose syndrome, a disease which threatens several endangered species of bats.

Cascade Cave is the name for three different caves in the same area and is together the largest cave in the park. It features an underground lake room and an  underground waterfall.

X Cave, named for the crossing pattern of its passages, features some of the largest rock formations in the park.

Saltpetre Cave was mined during the War of 1812 because saltpetre, or potassium nitrate, is a major component in gunpowder. Historic activities are a major part of the Saltpetre Cave tour. Bat Cave is also toured in the summer months, between Memorial Day and Labor Day, and is considered a "wild" cave tour since the cave has not been improved for walking tours. The cave is unique in that it is a hibernaculum for the endangered Indiana bat in the winter months.

Laurel Cave is the most visited of the non-commercial caves in the park, and contains some of the most interesting passages. 
Laurel Cave is open to the public during regular business hours in the summer months only (Memorial Day - Labor Day). All that is required is a permit available at the Welcome Center/Gift Shop. The permit gives you legal access to Laurel Cave (summer months only), Horn Hollow Caves and the connected Rimstone Cave.

Trails

Over thirty miles of hiking trails encounter seven natural bridges throughout the park. The Cascade Trail is a three-quarter mile trail passing through Box Canyon. This trail also passes by Fern Bridge and Raven Bridge as it meanders through the park. The half-mile Natural Bridge Trail passes beneath a third natural bridge, the only one in Kentucky that is paved and supports traffic. Longer trails include the  Carter Caves Cross Country Trail (The 4Cs Trail) and the  Kiser Hollow multi-access trail, which parallels the 4Cs trail for a couple of miles before encircling the outer boundaries of the park's property.

Smokey Valley Lake and Tygarts Creek
Smokey Valley Lake is a  lake within the park. Anglers will find populations of largemouth bass, bluegill, catfish, and crappie in the lake. The boat is accessible by ramp, but no gasoline motors are permitted.

Ecology 
The cave system houses a variety of organisms including:

Gallery

See also
 List of caves in the United States

References

External links
Carter Caves State Resort Park Kentucky Department of Parks

Protected areas of Carter County, Kentucky
Caves of Kentucky
State parks of Kentucky
Protected areas established in 1946
Show caves in the United States
Landforms of Carter County, Kentucky
1946 establishments in Kentucky